Siri ya Mtungi also known as (Secrets of the African Pot) is a Tanzanian television-series. It was first aired in 2012.

The main-theme of Siri ya Mtungi was to educate and deliver more awareness about HIV/AIDS prevention, Family planning, Maternal and child health.

Siri ya Mtungi  originally recorded in Swahili is also dubbed in English, French and Portuguese  as a way to reach a bigger audience.

Production 

The series was directed by Media For Development International (MFDI), and created by The Johns Hopkins Bloomberg School of Public Health Center for Communication Programs (JHU.CCP), in partnership with MFDI . 
The series received funding for production from, USAID (The United States Agency for International Development) and PEPFAR. Siri ya Mtungi was produced by CCP's Tanzania Capacity and Communication Project (TCCP).

Plot 

Cheche a family man is given a Photography Studio for commercial purposes as gift by a man named Habibu. The late Habibu is known to be as the photography guru and the best in business. Cheche's relationship with his family gets complicated as he begins his career in photography. He became the center of attention as his community views his new-life as an ideal one and exemplary.
He captures the soul of the community on its journey to dreams, hopes and personal crises in his unique portraits of families, friends and personal portraits. He starts being unfaithful to his wife as he started having affairs multiple partners (Women) including his teenage sweetheart Tula.

On the other hand Mzee kizito is seen to lead a peaceful life with his two wives and seventeen children. He runs a successful motor garage business that supports him and his family. Trouble begins as he is about to marry a third wife.

Nusura is a girlfriend of Duma a player and a criminal, and the daughter of Masharubu who is famously known as the Slum-lord. Nusura is against of Duma's criminal actions and hedonistic lifestyle, but worst happens when Duma gets into trouble with her father the slum-lord Masharubu.

Cast 

 Juma Rajab as Cheche  
 Beatrice Taisamo as Tula 
 Nkwabi Elias Ng'angasamala as Mzee Kizito 
 Hidaya Maeda as Nusura 
 Daudi Micheal as  Duma 
 MacDonald Haule as Masharubu 
 Yvonne Cherry as Lulu 
 Godliver Gordian as Cheusi 
 Betty Kazimbaya as Mwanaidi 
 Patrick Masele as Dafu 
 Halima Maulid as Farida 
 Seif Mbembe as  Mawazo 
 Yaeli Mpila as Steven 
 Khalidi Nyanza as Kovu 
 Suleimani Suleiman as Shoti

References 

Tanzanian television series